Cratoplastis is a genus of moths in the family Erebidae. The genus was described by Felder in 1874.

Species
Cratoplastis barrosi (Almeida, 1968) (from Brazil)
Cratoplastis catherinae (Rothschild, 1916) (from Brazil)
Cratoplastis diluta Felder & Rogenhofer, 1874 (from Central and South America)
Cratoplastis rectiradia (Hampson, 1901) (from Suriname)

References

External links

Phaegopterina
Moth genera